Zeno may refer to:

People
 Zeno (name), including a list of people and characters with the name

Philosophers
 Zeno of Elea, philosopher, follower of Parmenides, known for his paradoxes
 Zeno of Citium (333 – 264 BC), founder of the Stoic school of philosophy
 Zeno of Tarsus (3rd century BC), Stoic philosopher
 Zeno of Sidon (1st century BC), Epicurean philosopher
 Zeno of Rhodes (not later than 220 BC), historian and politician.

Other persons of antiquity
 Zeno of Caunus (3rd century BC), finance minister to the Ptolemies, whose papyri letters (the "Zenon archive") were discovered in the 20th century
 Zeno (physician) (3rd and 2nd centuries BC), Greek physician
 Zeno of Cyprus (4th century), Greek physician
 Zeno of Gaza (died c. 362), early Christian martyr
 Zeno of Verona (4th century), saint commemorated in the place name Basilica of San Zeno, Verona, Italy
 Zeno the Hermit (4th century?) disciple of St. Basil and saint
 Zeno (consul 448) (447–451), Roman general and consul
 Zeno (emperor) (c. 425 – 491), Roman Emperor
 Zeno (Bishop of Mérida) (5th century), Greek Bishop of Mérida, Extremadura

Arts, entertainment, and media
Zeno's Conscience, a novel by Italian writer Italo Svevo
Zeno (film), a 2009 New Zealand short film
Zeno (periodical), a German-language journal
Zeno.org, a German digital library
Zeno (album), a 2019 album by Muzi
Zeno Mountain EP a 2020 EP by Guster
Grand Zeno-sama the Omni-King, a character in the manga Dragon Ball Super
Zeno Zoldyck, a character in the manga Hunter x Hunter.

Other
Ozone Zeno, a French paraglider design
Zeno Mountain Farm, a non-profit, year round organization that hosts camps for people with and without disabilities
 Zeno, ancient name for the village of Akköse
 Zeno, Ohio, a community in the United States
 Zeno (crater), a lunar impact crater, named for Zeno of Citium
 Zeno (programming language), an imperative procedural programming language designed to be easy to learn and user friendly
 Zeno-Watch Basel, a Swiss clockmaker company specialised in aviation watches

See also 
 Quantum Zeno effect, an effect in quantum mechanics which disallows certain conditions in the decaying of a quantum state
 San Zeno (disambiguation)
 Xeno (disambiguation)
 Xenon (disambiguation)
 Zenon (disambiguation)
 Zenone (disambiguation)
 Zeno machine,  a hypothetical computational model
 Zeno's paradoxes, paradoxes by Zeno of Elea
 Zenonia zeno, an African butterfly
 Zenos, a book of Mormon scripture